Frank Gasperik (November 5, 1942 – May 3, 2007) was an author, writer, songwriter and filk singer.

Frank appeared as a character in several science fiction novels including Lucifer's Hammer (as Mark Czescu), Footfall (as Harry Reddington aka Hairy Red)<ref
 name="chaosmanor">

</ref> and Fallen Angels, all by the writing team of Larry Niven and Jerry Pournelle. He maintained a close friendship with Niven and Pournelle throughout their careers, serving as Pournelle's editorial assistant on his Byte column. He also co-wrote a story, "Janesfort War", with Leslie Fish that was published in Pournelle's War World collection, CoDominium: Revolt on War World.

References

External links 
 LosCon 30 guest biography 
 Memorial page on Larry Niven fan website

1942 births
2007 deaths
American male songwriters
20th-century American writers
American science fiction writers
Filkers
20th-century American male singers
20th-century American singers
20th-century American male writers